The Pay-Off is a 1930 American pre-Code crime drama film directed by Lowell Sherman, who also starred in the film along with Marian Nixon and Hugh Trevor. The screenplay was adapted by Jane Murfin, along with Samuel Shipman and John B. Hymer, based on Shipman and Hymer's 1927 play, Crime.

Plot
Gene Fenmore is a suave gentleman, safely ensconced in the upper crust of society.  Unbeknownst to his society acquaintances, he is also the leader of the largest mob in the city.  But it is a mob with scruples, thanks to Fenmore, and they only prey on dishonest businessmen, and never shoot or kill anyone.  However, there is a power struggle developing between Fenmore and his number two man, Rocky, who disagrees with the moral constraints put on the gang by Fenmore. The tension between the two men is exacerbated by the fact Rocky has taken Fenmore's girlfriend, Dot away from him.

As he starts to exert his influence on the other gang members, Rocky holds up a young engaged couple, Nancy and Tommy, of their last few dollars for the fun of it. When Fenmore hears of the robbery, he gives them back their money and takes them under his wing, offering the both of them jobs on the legitimate side of his business.  When Rocky sees that Fenmore has taken a liking to the couple, he develops a plan to use them in order to take over Fenmore's gang. Even though Fenmore has given explicit orders not to involve the couple in the illicit activities of the gang, Rocky takes them along when he goes to hold up a jewelry store.  When the robbery goes wrong, Rocky ends up shooting and killing the owner of the store, after which he frames Tommy and Annabelle for the crime.

In order to set things right, Fenmore orchestrates a confrontation with the police, wherein he confesses to the jewelry store robbery, and in the ensuing melee, Rocky is killed.  As he is led off in handcuffs, Fenmore turns to the police officer and says, "If it wasn't for men like me, they wouldn't need men like you."

Cast 
Lowell Sherman as Gene Fenmore
Marian Nixon as Nancy
Hugh Trevor as Rocky
William Janney as Tommy
Helene Millard as Dot
George F. Marion as Mouse
Walter McGrail as Emory
Robert McWade as Frank
Alan Roscoe as District Attorney
Lita Chevret as Margy
Bert Moorhouse as Spat

(Cast list as per AFI database)

Notes 
The film is based on the play Crime by Shipman and Hymer, which was performed at the Eltinge 42nd Street Theatre (currently the Empire Theatre) in New York City from February to August 1927. In 1938, RKO would remake the film, under the title, Law of the Underworld.

In 1958, the film entered the public domain in the United States because the claimants did not renew its copyright registration in the 28th year after publication.

References

External links

1930 films
1930 crime drama films
1930s English-language films
American black-and-white films
American crime drama films
Films directed by Lowell Sherman
American films based on plays
Films with screenplays by Jane Murfin
1930s American films